Alex Zhang Hungtai (born September 4, 1980 in Taipei) is a Taiwanese-born Canadian musician and actor. In addition to his given name, he makes music under the names Last Lizard and Dirty Beaches.

Zhang released several EPs and three albums as Dirty Beaches on cassette-only labels before releasing his fourth full-length, Badlands, in March 2011. Badlands, unlike Zhang's earlier work, included his vocals on most songs. The album was long listed as a nominee for the 2011 Polaris Music Prize. Drifters/Love Is The Devil followed in 2013, pushing further into no wave, electronic music, jazz and ambient territory.

In 2014 Zhang decided to end the Dirty Beaches project after releasing the instrumental album Stateless, on which he played sax. As Last Lizard, Zhang collaborated with jazz and improvisational musicians and released new solo pieces on Soundcloud, Vimeo and Vine. In 2016 Zhang released the instrumental piano album Knave of Hearts under his own name.

Zhang has also recorded original film soundtracks for several documentaries, including Water Park (2012) and Who Is Arthur Chu? (2017), in addition to directing music videos for himself and others.

History
Dirty Beaches began as a one-man band, sometimes employing sampling, inspired by Zhang's longtime love of hip hop. In addition to his own years moving between countries and on the road touring, films are one of Zhang's influences, particularly those by Wong Kar-wai. Zhang said Wong's movies are "usually about the passage of time, and how in relation it distorts your relationship with everything else in life. The central Dirty Beaches character is a product of those experiences. Of someone traveling long distances in search of something, in exile, misplaced, with no home to return to." Zhang has lived in Taipei, Queens, Etobicoke, Honolulu, San Francisco, Shanghai, Vancouver, Montreal, Berlin, Lisbon and Los Angeles, among other cities.

Dirty Beaches has released work on record labels throughout the world since his first album Old Blood came out on Montreal's Fixture Records in 2007. Dirty Beaches has recorded and toured with musicians such as Dum Dum Girls, U.S. Girls, Tonya Harding, Ela Orleans, and Xiu Xiu. In 2011, Zhang was able to leave a kitchen job to play music full-time. First touring solo, he then put together a live band with sax player Francesco De Gallo and drummer Jesse Locke. On tour, Dirty Beaches moved away from the sample-based rock n roll of Badlands to embrace a more improvised sound. In 2012, guitarist Shub Roy and electronic musician Bernardino Femminielli joined Dirty Beaches live and in the studio, and they remain members of the band as of 2013.

After the release of Badlands and a number of EPs and collaborations, Dirty Beaches recorded 75 minutes of new material in late 2012 and early 2013. One set of songs, Drifters, was begun at La Brique recording space in Montreal and features Zhang's vocals and songwriting, along with instrumental contributions by Roy and Femminielli and former bandmates De Gallo and Locke. Making use of live instruments- guitar, bass, keyboard, drum machines and saxophones- arranged into original loops, none of the eight songs include any samples of previously existent recordings, a change from Zhang's previous working methods. During the course of recording Drifters, Zhang's relationship of several years ended in Canada and he relocated to the studio of friend Anton Newcombe in Berlin, where he finished the record and also recorded Love is the Devil, an instrumental set of eight songs, in late hours when the studio was not in use.

Also in 2013, musician and rapper JPEGMafia messaged Zhang via Instagram for career advice. Zhang's reply was encouraging: “Just do what you want to do. Fuck everyone else. Just do it your way." Ahead of the release of JPEGMafia's 2018 album Veteran, JPEGMafia shared this interaction and called it "a catalyst to my self-discovery".

Drifters/Love Is The Devil was released as a double LP, as well as on a single CD and in digital formats, by the Zoo Music label in May 2013. In November, Dirty Beaches played the All Tomorrow's Parties festival held at the seaside resort of Camber Sands, United Kingdom.

In August 2014, Dirty Beaches announced his 3rd album, Stateless, which would be entirely instrumental and released in November 2014. In a series of tweets in October 2014, Dirty Beaches announced their breakup.

Post-Dirty Beaches solo career 
In early 2015, Zhang began releasing music under the project name of Last Lizard. He also started releasing music under his own name. According to Pitchfork, "since retiring the Dirty Beaches moniker in 2014, having completed the transition from songs to soundscaping, Zhang has fully indulged his newfound aesthetic freedom. Whether he's releasing meditative piano instrumentals, forming violent free-jazz trios, or constructing dark, dissonant sound collages with Love Theme, Zhang is never afraid to expose his work's jagged edges. He's long favored a raw field-recording ambience that amplifies the overarching sense of improvised experiments being caught on tape in real time."

In 2016, Zhang appeared as the central character in the short film [Correspondence], directed by [Loic Zimmermann], featuring Zhang’s sax based original score and some LoFi piano soundscapes and voiceovers read by [Mike Watt]. The film is a tribute to [News from Home] by [Chantal Akerman].

On June 4, 2017, Zhang appeared in the fifth, David Lynch-directed episode of the revived third season of Twin Peaks. Playing with Dean Hurley and Riley Lynch as part of the group Trouble, Zhang played sax in the scene. The song, "Snake Eyes," was issued as a single by Sacred Bones Records.

In January 2018, he appeared alongside Jessica Henwick and Kiko Mizuhara in the short film "Yo! My Saint", directed by Ana Lily Amirpour and featuring music from Karen O and Michael Kiwanuka promoting the fashion label Kenzo's spring line.

In July 2018, Zhang released the album Divine Weight. The recording process for Divine Weight originated with Zhang's dissatisfaction with his saxophone recordings prompting him to feed them through a laptop, "manipulating the sounds into entirely new forms, like rusted copper piping stripped out of an abandoned building and melted down into shiny, interwoven wiring." The recordings were influenced by Chilean-French mystic and filmmaker Alejandro Jodorowsky, and the cover shows a distorted image of the recently deceased Japanese Butoh dancer Kazuo Ohno.

In 2018, the film August at Akiko’s had its premiere at film festivals. Directed by Christopher Makoto Yogi and set in Zhang’s childhood home of Hawai’i, the film features Zhang in a leading role, and it also features Zhang’s sax based original score, which was released as a soundtrack album.

In 2020, Zhang collaborated on two full length instrumental albums, LONGONE with Tseng Kuo-Hung and STYX with Pavel Milyakov.

Discography

Studio albums

As Dirty Beaches
 Old Blood (2007, Fixture Records)
 Horror (2008, Fixture Records)
 Night City (2010, Night People)
 Badlands (2011, Zoo Music)
 Drifters/Love Is The Devil (2013, Zoo Music)
 Stateless (2014, Zoo Music)

As Alex Zhang Hungtai
 Knave Of Hearts (2016, Ascetic House)
 Divine Weight (2018, NON Worldwide)

Collaborative albums
Split (2009, Campaign for Infinity) split album with Omon Ra II, as Dirty Beaches
Mae Mae (2011, free download) collaborative album with Apollo Ghosts, as Masterchef
Decadent (2010, Campaign for Infinity) split album with Generic Shit, Hobo Cubes & Street Gnar, as Dirty Beaches
Double Feature (2011, Night People/ La Station Radar/ Atelier Ciseaux) split album with Ela Orleans, as Dirty Beaches
Statement (2012, Clan Destine Records) split album with Ela Orleans, Slim Twig & U.S. Girls, as Dirty Beaches
Love Theme (2017, Alter) collaborative project with Austin Milne and Simon Frank, as Alex Zhang Hungtai
LONGONE (2020) collaborative album with Tseng Kuo-Hung
STYX (2020) collaborative album with Pavel Milyakov

Live albums
The Spirit of Crazy Horse (Live at Landmark: Bergen, Norway) (2012, digital release) as Dirty Beaches
Âncora (2016, Grain Of Sound) collaboration with David Maranha and Gabriel Ferrandini trio, as Alex Zhang Hungtai

Singles and EPs

As Dirty Beaches
 Chess Music EP (2007)
 Seaside EP (2008, Fixture Records)
 Bird EP (2009, Fixture Records)
 Dirty Beaches cassette (2009, Night People)
 Golden Desert Sun single (2010, Italian Beach Babes)
 B Side cassette (2010, La Station Radar)
 True Blue single (2010, Zoo Music)
 Solid State Gold cassette (2010, Rose Mansion Analog)
 No Fun single (2011, Italian Beach Babes)
 Lone Runner single (2011, Suicide Squeeze Records)
 Tarlabaşı single (2012, BRONSON Produzioni)
 Dune Walker single (2012, Slowboy Records)
 Elizabeth's Theme single (2012, Kingfisher Bluez)
 Hotel EP (2014, BIG LOVE Records)
 Neon Gods of Lost Youth EP (2014)

Collaborative singles and EPs
U.S. Girls/Dirty Beaches (2010, Sibling Sex) split EP
The Singer (2011, Soft Power Records) split single with Conor Prendergast
Xiu Xiu/Dirty Beaches (2012, Bella Union) split single for Record Store Day
Dirty Beaches/Tonstartssbandht (2013, Spacebridge Records) split cassette EP
Snake Eyes (2017, Sacred Bones Records) single by Trouble, a group comprising Dean Hurley, Riley Lynch and Alex Zhang Hungtai

Compilations
Expressway (2012, Bathetic Records) compilation co-curated by Alex Zhang Hungtai

Soundtracks
Practical ESP (2011) directed by Zoe Kirk-Gushowaty
The Hippo (2012) directed by J. Asher Lynch
Waterpark (2013) directed by Evan Prosofsky
Who Is Arthur Chu? (2017) directed by Yu Gu and Scott Drucker
August at Akiko's (2018) directed by Christopher Makoto Yogi
I Was a Simple Man (2021) directed by Christopher Makoto Yogi (soundtrack by Zhang Hungtai and Pierre Guerineau)
Godland (2022) directed by Hlynur Pálmason (soundtrack by Zhang Hungtai)

Music videos

As Dirty Beaches
"West Coast Bird" (2009) directed by Alex Zhang Hungtai
"Shangri-La" (2010) directed by Alex Zhang Hungtai
"True Blue" (2010) directed by Alex Calder
"Lord Knows Best" (2011) directed by Zoe Kirk-Gushowaty
"Speedway King" (2011) directed by Alex Zhang Hungtai
"Lone Runner" (2011) directed by Kevin Luna
"White Sand" (2011) directed by Tsien-Tsien Zhang, cinematography by Christopher Doyle
"Neon Gods & Funeral Strippers" (2012) directed by Alex Zhang Hungtai
"Casino Lisboa" (2013) directed by Gary Boyle
"I Dream in Neon" (2013) directed by Michael Lawrence
"Stateless" (2014) directed by Alex Zhang Hungtai
"Time Washes Everything Away" (2014) directed by Loic Zimmermann

As Last Lizard
"Alex Zhang Hungtai: Last Lizard" (2015) directed by Emily Kai Bock

Videos directed for other artists
"Between" by Night Musik (2015)

References

External links

Analog Beach
2012 interview on Pacifica Radio

Canadian indie rock musicians
Musicians from Taipei
Living people
Taiwanese emigrants to Canada
Canadian musicians of Taiwanese descent
Canadian rock guitarists
Canadian male guitarists
Canadian rock singers
One-man bands
1980 births
21st-century Canadian guitarists
21st-century Canadian male singers